"If I Say" is a song by English rock band Mumford & Sons. It was released as a promotional single from their fourth studio album, Delta, on 25 October 2018. The song was written by Marcus Mumford, Winston Marshall, Ben Lovett and Ted Dwane. The band began playing the track live in May 2017. A studio version of the song could be heard on a livestream from the band’s Instagram account in April 2018.

Composition
Jordan Bassett of NME described the song as having "full-blown orchestral arrangements".

Track listing

Charts

Release history

References

2018 singles
2018 songs
Mumford & Sons songs
Songs written by Marcus Mumford
Songs written by Winston Marshall
Songs written by Ben Lovett (British musician)
Songs written by Ted Dwane
Rock ballads